"Let Me Be the One" is a 1953 song written by Paul Blevins, Joe Hobson and W.S. Stevenson, and made famous by up-and-coming country singer Hank Locklin.

Background
Locklin, a fledgling country star who had formed a backing band called the Rocky Mountain Boys, had recorded for a variety of small regional labels, including Gold Star and Royalty. Success didn't come his way until he joined with Four Star Records, when 1949's "The Same Sweet Girl" reached No. 8 on the Billboard country chart. However, it wasn't until 1953 when he finally broke through to the top of the chart with "Let Me Be the One." While sustained success didn't come until the mid-1950s, "Let Me Be the One" paved the way for Locklin's future successes at the Decca and RCA recording labels, where he became associated with such songs as "Why Baby Why," "Geisha Girl," "Send Me the Pillow That You Dream On" and "Please Help Me, I'm Falling."

Chart performance
In December 1953, the song was Hank Locklin's first No. 1 hit, spending three weeks atop the Billboard country chart.

References
 

 
1953 singles
Hank Locklin songs
Song recordings produced by Owen Bradley
Songs written by W.S. Stevenson